The 1924 United States presidential election in Idaho took place on November 4, 1924, as part of the 1924 United States presidential election. State voters chose four representatives, or electors, to the Electoral College, who voted for president and vice president.

Background
At state level, Idaho had begun in 1902 to be very much a one-party Republican state, which it has largely remained since apart from the New Deal era of the 1930s and 1940s. For a time there was also a perception that the William Jennings Bryan-led Democratic Party had failed as a "party of reform".

However, with the aid of a powerful "peace vote" due to opposition to participation in World War I, and a considerable part of the substantial vote for Eugene Debs, Woodrow Wilson almost completely swept the Western and Plains States in 1916 (Idaho included), losing only South Dakota and Oregon. These gains were to be lost due to growing anti-Asian and isolationist feelings in the West – James M. Cox in 1920 lost every Idaho county by double digits.

To further marginalize the Democrats, in 1922 "Progressive Party" nominee H.F. Samuels ran ahead of Democratic candidate and former Governor Moses Alexander.

Primaries
During the pre-election primaries the Democratic Party was divided between a rural, southern and Western wing led by Woodrow Wilson's son-in-law William Giibs McAdoo, opposed to an urban, immigrant and anti-Prohibition faction in major northern cities. The man who would ultimately represent this urban faction was New York Governor Al Smith, whose Catholic faith was vehemently opposed by many rural Appalachian Democrats. Even in his adopted West, McAdoo was not universally liked because of his links to Edward L. Doheny and Harding's "Teapot Dome" petroleum scandal; nonetheless there was sufficient hostility in Idaho to Smith that the state's delegation – alongside others in the West – held a parade for McAdoo at the beginning of the party's convention in New York City. Delegates in Idaho continued to support McAdoo as the convention remained undecided, until the one hundred and first ballot when they finally shifted to former Agriculture Secretary David F. Houston and then to Montana Senator Thomas J. Walsh on the one hundred and second. The one hundred and third ballot saw the Gem State switch to West Virgnian John W. Davis, who won the nomination thereon.

Third-party challenge
The conservatism of Coolidge and Davis resulted in Wisconsin Senator Robert M. La Follette senior mounting a third-party challenge – which La Follette had planned even before the Democratic Convention. In agricultural western and midwestern states like Idaho, there was widespread discontent with the policies of the incumbent Coolidge Administration, and Idaho became one of La Follette's primary targets from the start of his campaign with running mate Burton K. Wheeler of Montana. By the end of July the GOP was concerned that La Follette was showing strength in the Gem State, and this fear grew as the election drew nearer. It was always clear Democrat Davis had no chance in this GOP bastion, and this was backed up by polls in the middle of October, which showed Davis running third and that many of the state's small number of Democrats were backing La Follette.

Thinking he had won most of the West, despite polls actually showing him well behind Coolidge except in his home state, Nevada, and the northern Plains States, La Follette did not campaign in the state during October, preferring to work in the eastern states where he felt he could gain more additional support. In Idaho itself, polls in the four weeks of October showed Coolidge well ahead with around fifty percent of the vote.

Vote
As it turned out, Coolidge actually underperformed the October polls in the Gem State, but still comfortably carried the state by a double-digit margin over La Follette. Coolidge's strong performance in the conservative, highly Mormon southeast and also in Northern Idaho ensured his victory, whilst La Follette did best in rural areas of the southwest and central mountains, where he carried eight counties.

Results

Results by county

See also
 United States presidential elections in Idaho

Notes

References

Idaho
1924
1924 Idaho elections